Venulus was an ambassador sent by Turnus of Ardea to the Greek hero Diomedes to request assistance in a war against Aeneas.  He appears as a character in Vergil's Aeneid (in Books 8 and 11) and Ovid's Metamorphoses (Book 14); in both epics, he seems to serve as a proxy or counterpart of the goddess Venus (Paschalis 288, Barchiesi 119), whose name is incorporated in his own.  There is no evidence for his existence beyond (or prior to) the Aeneid and Metamorphoses.

References 

 Barchiesi, A. (1999) "Venus' Masterplot: Ovid and the Homeric Hymns," in P. Hardie, A. Barchiesi, and S. Hinds (eds) Ovidian Transformations: Essays on Ovid's Metamorphoses and its Reception (Cambridge Philological Society, Supplementary Volume no. 23). 112–26.
 Paschalis, M. (1997) Virgil's Aeneid: Semantic Relations and Proper Names. Oxford: Clarendon Press.

Characters in the Aeneid
Metamorphoses characters